The Church of St John the Baptist in Pilton, Somerset, England, dates from the 11th century and has been designated as a Grade I listed building.

The present Norman and Medieval structure, may stand on the site of an earlier wattle and daub church built by the early missionaries.

In 2011 a new lighting system was installed at a cost of £17,000 with financial support from Glastonbury Festival and Viridor Landfill Communities Fund.

The Anglican parish is part of the benefice of Pilton with Croscombe, North Wootton and Dinder within the archdeaconry of Wells.

See also

 List of Grade I listed buildings in Mendip
 List of towers in Somerset
 List of ecclesiastical parishes in the Diocese of Bath and Wells

References

Grade I listed churches in Somerset
Church of England church buildings in Mendip District
11th-century church buildings in England
Grade I listed buildings in Mendip District